Bardeghun (also Romanized as Bardeghūn) is a village in Howmeh Rural District, in the Central District of Bandar Lengeh County, Hormozgan Province, Iran. At the 2006 census, its population was 8, in 6 families.

References 

Populated places in Bandar Lengeh County